The 2017 International Rules Series (officially the 2017 Virgin Australia International Rules Series) was the 20th International Rules Series contested by Gaelic footballers from Ireland and Australian footballers from Australia. The series was hosted by Australia and was the first in four years to revert to an aggregate points format. The two test matches were played on 12 and 18 November 2017 at the Adelaide Oval and Domain Stadium.

Fixtures
 First test match: Australia v. Ireland, 12 November 2017 
 Second test match: Australia v. Ireland, 18 November 2017

Background
The series reverted to the traditional two-match format, with the team scoring the highest amount over the two test matches being the winner. The AFL and GAA announced the dates of the two matches in November 2016. In March 2017 West Australian Football Commission (WAFC) chief executive Gavin Taylor revealed that the WAFC would bid for the right to host one of the test matches at Domain Stadium (which is the headquarters of the WAFC), in what would likely be the venue's final elite-level football match considering the AFL's move to the new Perth Stadium by the start of the 2018 season. On 8 August 2017, the AFL announced that the Adelaide Oval in Adelaide, South Australia would host the first test and Domain Stadium in Perth, Western Australia would host the second test. The series was broadcast live on the Seven Network in Australia and on RTÉ Television in Ireland.

Australian team
The AFL considered a number of prospective coaches to manage the Australian team. Among the favourites for the role included 2016 premiership coach Luke Beveridge, previous Australian coach Alastair Clarkson, as well as former assistant coaches of the Australian team Chris Scott (eventual appointee) and Ross Lyon. On 17 July, the AFL announced that Scott had been selected for the coaching position, who said the appointment was "a tremendous honour". Scott was joined by Lyon and brother Brad as assistant coaches.

The initial Australian squad was announced on 12 October 2017. Among the squad were multiple All-Australians Gary Ablett Jr., Patrick Dangerfield, Scott Pendlebury and Joel Selwood, and five players – Michael Hibberd, Rory Laird, Zach Merrett, Paddy Ryder and Dayne Zorko – who had made the All-Australian team for the first time in their careers in 2017. Of the 17-man squad, nine players – Ablett, Nat Fyfe, Toby Greene, Hibberd, Laird, Merrett, Ryder, Rory Sloane and Zorko – have not represented Australia in International rules football before. Only three players – Eddie Betts, Dangerfield and Brendon Goddard – represented Australia in the 2015 series. The selectors had the capacity to add further selections closer to the matches, after assessing other players' availability from their leave periods. Goddard was chosen to fill the goalkeeper position for the Australian team, while Greene was ruled out with a broken toe. An additional six players were selected to fill the squad on 2 November 2017. Only five days prior to the first test, Ablett pulled out of the Australian team, citing personal reasons. On 10 November, three-time Hawthorn premiership player Shaun Burgoyne was appointed captain of the Australian team. Ahead of the second test match, North Melbourne midfielder Shaun Higgins was brought into the Australian squad, replacing the injured Scott Pendlebury and Paddy Ryder.

Irish team
Joe Kernan, Ireland's manager for the 2015 series, returned to coach the Irish team for a second time, joined by Pádraic Joyce, Darragh Ó Sé and Dermot Earley Jnr on the coaching and selection panel. Kernan revealed his coaching panel would consider fitness as well as catching and kicking skills when it came to selecting the squad, and praised the series organisers for returning the concept to a two-match series. On 25 October, Kernan and the Irish management team announced a 21-man touring squad for the series. Mayo's Aidan O'Shea, who represented Ireland in the 2013, 2014 and 2015 series, was announced as captain of the team whilst Conor McManus of Monaghan was appointed vice-captain. In total 14 counties were represented on the panel, including four from Mayo and three from Kerry; however no players from 2017 All-Ireland SFC winners Dublin were selected. Seán Powter of Cork and Niall Grimley of Armagh were later added to the team, completing the final 23-man squad. After Pearce Hanley broke his hand in the first test match, Monaghan player Darren Hughes flew out to Australia for the second test match, replacing Hanley's position in the squad. Additionally, former  AFL defender Ciarán Sheehan was drafted into the Irish squad prior to the second test match.

Squads

 Coach: Chris Scott

 Coach: Joe Kernan (Armagh)

Results

See also
 International rules football
 Gaelic football
 Australian rules football
 Relationship between Gaelic football and Australian rules football

Notes

References

International Rules Series
International Rules series
International Rules series
International sports competitions hosted by Australia
International Rules Series